Jakarta Great Sale Festival or Festival Jakarta Great Sale (FJGS) is an annual sale festival which is held to celebrate anniversary of Jakarta, Indonesia. It is held in the month of June and July.

FJGS is participated by major shopping malls of Jakarta metro area. Aside from regular discounts, some of the malls offer malls midnight sales. The festival also involves traditional markets and hotels.

History
The city administration held an event called Festival Pertokoan (Shopping Festival) in 1982. The name later changed to Pesta Diskon (Discount Party). During 1990's, the name is changed to Jakarta Great Sale.

See also
Jakarta Fair
Pasar Malam Besar

References

Sales
Events in Jakarta
Annual events in Indonesia
Tourist attractions in Jakarta
Festivals in Indonesia